The 2010 Pacific Coast Soccer League season was the 15th season in the modern era of the league. The regular season began on 1 May and ended on 18 July, and was followed by the Challenge Cup, a post season tournament of the top four teams to determine the league's champion. Each team played 16 games. The women's open division consisted of 9 teams while the men's open division had 7.

In the Men's Premier division, the Vancouver Thunderbirds won both the season and the playoffs. In the Women's Premier division, the Whitecaps Prospects finished the regular season in first place, but the Fraser Valley Action won the playoffs.

Men's
The 2010 Pacific Coast Soccer League season will be played from 1 May to 18 July 2010.  This season will see 7 teams on the Premier Men's group compete.  At the end of the season there will be a play-off to determine which team will enter the BC Senior A Cup.

Standings

Results table

Women's
The teams played a 16-game, unbalanced schedule.  The Whitecaps residency program that recruits from around the province ran rough shod over the other teams. The Victoria Highlanders women also were dominant with two former professionals on their roster.

Standings

Source:

Top Goalscorers

Source:

References

http://www.eightysixforever.com/2010/8/20/1632935/a-young-persons-guide-to-the

2010 domestic association football leagues
3
2010
Pacific Coast Soccer